Robert Rosenberg (1951 in Boston – October 24, 2006 in Tel Aviv), was a writer, journalist, poet and Internet pioneer. He spent most of his adult life in Tel Aviv. He was survived, briefly by his wife, painter Silvia Rosenberg, who also died of cancer.

The author of several crime novels, Rosenberg also collaborated with Moshe "Muki" Betzer in writing Secret Soldier. The autobiography of Israel's Greatest Commando.

Bibliography

Own work

As a co-author

References

1951 births
2006 deaths
Israeli biographers
Israeli novelists
Israeli journalists
20th-century novelists
20th-century biographers
20th-century journalists